Ioannis Protos is a Paralympian athlete from Greece competing mainly in category T13 sprint events.

He competed in the 2004 Summer Paralympics in Athens, Greece.  There he finished sixth in the men's 100 metres – T13 event and finished fourth in the men's 200 metres – T13 event.  He also competed at the 2008 Summer Paralympics in Beijing, China.    There he won a bronze medal in the men's 400 metres – T13 event and finished seventh in the men's 200 metres – T13 event

External links
 

Year of birth missing (living people)
Living people
Paralympic athletes of Greece
Athletes (track and field) at the 2004 Summer Paralympics
Athletes (track and field) at the 2008 Summer Paralympics
Paralympic bronze medalists for Greece
Athletes (track and field) at the 2012 Summer Paralympics
Medalists at the 2004 Summer Paralympics
Paralympic medalists in athletics (track and field)
Greek male sprinters
21st-century Greek people